Buccaneer Arena is a 3,461-seat, with standing room for an additional 700, multi-purpose arena in Urbandale, Iowa, that is home to the Des Moines Buccaneers ice hockey team in the United States Hockey League. Before the Bucs began playing in 1980, the International Hockey League's Des Moines Oak Leafs and Des Moines Capitols franchise played here.

Building history
The arena opened on November 12, 1961 as the Des Moines Ice Arena. It was later renamed the Metro Ice Sports Arena before becoming Buccaneer Arena in mid-2004.  On September 22, 2005, Buccaneer Arena was renamed 95-KGGO Arena after Citadel Broadcasting, owners of radio station KGGO, purchased the naming rights to the arena. It is nicknamed the "Madhouse on Hickman" for its location on Hickman Road. In 2008, the arena changed its name back to Buccaneer Arena. In 2020, the arena's roof was damaged during the August 2020 Midwest derecho.

Tenants
The arena served as home ice for the Des Moines Buccaneers' ten championship seasons in the 1990s: Anderson Cup regular season champions in 1993–94, 1994–95, 1997–98, 1998–99; Clark Cup playoff champions in 1992, 1995, 1999, 2006; and Gold Cup Junior A champions in 1992, 1995, 1998. Following the damage to the roof in 2020, the team was forced to start the 2020–21 season at Wells Fargo Arena in downtown Des Moines. In November 2020, the team announced it would be replacing the old arena as part of a project to turn a vacant department store on Merle Hay Road into a new 3,500-seat arena. Buccaneer Arena completed repairs in January 2021, and the team moved back until the new arena is complete

In 2007, the arena hosted the College Hockey America championship tournament.  The arena has also hosted mixed martial arts.

References

External links
 Des Moines Buccaneers official website
 RinkAtlas listing for Buccaneer Arena
 Buccaneer Arena seating chart

Indoor ice hockey venues in the United States
Sports in Des Moines, Iowa
Sports venues in Greater Des Moines
Sports venues in Iowa
Buildings and structures in Polk County, Iowa
Tourist attractions in Polk County, Iowa
Urbandale, Iowa
1961 establishments in Iowa
Sports venues completed in 1961